The 18th Alabama Infantry Regiment was an infantry regiment that served in the Confederate Army during the American Civil War.

Service
The 18th Alabama Infantry Regiment was mustered in at Auburn, Alabama, on September 4, 1861.

The regiment surrendered  at Meridian, Mississippi, on May 4, 1865.

Commanders
 Colonel Edward Courtney Bullock
 Colonel James Thadeus Holtzclaw
 Colonel Eli Sims Shorter
 Colonel James Strawbridge (Confederate Officer)

See also
Alabama Civil War Confederate Units
Alabama in the American Civil War

References

Units and formations of the Confederate States Army from Alabama
1861 establishments in Alabama
Military units and formations established in 1861